Bembecia iberica is a moth of the family Sesiidae. It is found in France, Spain, Portugal and Italy and on Corsica and Sardinia.

The wingspan is 19–21 mm.

The larvae feed on Lotus, Hippocrepis, Tetragonolobus, Anthyllis vulneraria, Melilotus, Ononis viscosa and Onobrychis. They feed on the roots of their host plant.

References

Moths described in 1992
Sesiidae
Moths of Europe